Jack Carleton Duncan (born 19 April 1993) is an Australian goalkeeper who plays for A-League club Newcastle Jets.

Club career

Newcastle Jets
In 2010 Duncan signed for A-League club Newcastle Jets from NSW Premier League side Sutherland Sharks. He made his professional debut in the 2011-12 A-League season on 19 November 2011, in a round 7 clash against Brisbane Roar.

Perth Glory
On 2 May 2013, Duncan joined Perth Glory.

Randers FC
On 15 May 2015, Duncan signed a 2-year deal with Randers FC. He made his Danish Superliga debut on 16 May 2016 for the club in a 3–2 away victory over Viborg FF.
In June 2016, Duncan asked to be released from his second contracted year with Randers FC because there was no indication to him becoming first choice.

Return to Newcastle Jets
On 24 June 2016, Duncan returned to Newcastle Jets, signing a 2-year deal.

Career statistics

CS = Clean Sheets

1 - includes A-League final series statistics
2 - AFC Champions League statistics are included in season ending during group stages (i.e. ACL 2012 and A-League season 2011–12 etc.)

References 

1993 births
Living people
Sportspeople from Hobart
Soccer players from Tasmania
Soccer players from Perth, Western Australia
Australian soccer players
Newcastle Jets FC players
Perth Glory FC players
Randers FC players
Al-Qadsiah FC players
A-League Men players
National Premier Leagues players
Danish Superliga players
Saudi Professional League players
Saudi First Division League players
Australian expatriate sportspeople in Denmark
Australian expatriate sportspeople in Saudi Arabia
Expatriate footballers in Saudi Arabia
Association football goalkeepers